Newtownforbes is a village in County Longford, Ireland. It was historically called Lisbrack, an anglicisation of the Irish name.

The N4 National primary route passes through  the Main Street of the village, which is situated 6 km (4 miles) northwest of Longford Town.
The population of Newtownforbes is 778, as of the 2016 Census. The national school is Scoil Mhuire.  The village has a Catholic church, St. Mary's which has been recently restored. One feature of the renovation is the new west windows, by Joe Sheridan of Kilkenny which shows Virgin Mary with Jesus and St. John and a playfriend. It also shows St. Elither, a local saint, building the first Christian church of the village. The village also has four public houses, several shops and other amenities to cater for the expanding village.  The sports complex has a floodlit pitch and indoor basketball court.

Newtownforbes is in the parish of Clonguish; its Irish name is Cluain geis which means The Meadow of the Swans. Clonguish is bordered by four other parishes, Killashee, Templemicheal, Killoe and Drumlish. The parish also shares a common boundary with the province of Connacht in that it adjoins the parishes of Bornacoola and Gortletteragh in County Leitrim and is separated by the Shannon from Kilbarry in County Roscommon. The River Camlin flows through the south-western end of the parish.
On the approach to Newtownforbes from Longford, there is an old house called Minard House on the left. It was built in the 1760s and was the base to a local radio station.

History
Newtownforbes takes its name from the Forbes family, also known as the Earl of Granard, who originated in Aberdeen and were granted lands in the area around 1621, and have been resident in Castleforbes since 1691. The family was in service to the Crown and successive generations were promoted to Viscount, Baronet and eventually Earldom. The family changed the name of the village from Lisbrack to Newtownforbes around 1750. Many of the houses in the original part of the village date from the late nineteenth and early twentieth centuries.

One of the four pubs in the town, Casey's Public House, was the last pub in the Midlands to stop the practise of bottling Guinness for the brewery and labelling it. Michael Collins reputedly drank in this pub from time to time.

Heritage and culture

Castleforbes

Castleforbes is situated about 5 km (3 miles) from Longford town and stands between Newtownforbes and Lough Forbes on the River Shannon.  The castle and grounds are private with strictly no public access.

History of Castleforbes
Built to the design of John Hargrave from Cork, Castleforbes is a 19th-century structure of cut limestone. The entrance gateway of the castle is French style which is about one mile (1.6 km) from the castle itself. There are some narrow windows in the shape of an arch as well as the remains of some English style windows.

In 1909 following the marriage of Bernard Forbes, 8th Earl of Granard to Beatrice, daughter of the wealthy Ogden Mills of Staatsburg, New York, the decoration of the castle was completed. Lady Jane structured the original building of Castleforbes in 1624. Over the years, the Castle has been added to. In 1825 the castle was partly burned. It was saved by a dog called 'Pilot' whose barking woke everyone in the castle.

 of land was given to them in 1619. In 1854 together the castle covered  of land within its demesne. It was the largest demesne in Longford. In 1876 the total estate, including parts of land from around the parish, Clonguish, Drumlish, Killashee and near Mullingar, covered  of land. Today Lady Georgina, the present owner, owns only the land within the demesne, .

In 1911 the castle was the site of the introduction to Ireland of the Eastern grey squirrel (Sciurus carolinensis), when six pairs were given as a wedding gift to Lord Forbes and some later escaped into the wild.

Castleforbes airfield
The airfield, code EICS, was constructed in 1975 on the estate with a 1275 metre grass runway by Arthur Forbes, 9th Earl of Granard for the use of himself and invited friends.  Following his death in 1992 the airfield's licence was revoked and it closed.

Newtownforbes railway station

Originally built by the Midland and Great Western Railway Company c. 1860 to serve the Mullingar to Sligo line the station was closed in 1963. It was probably built to designs by George Wilkinson (1814 - 1890), a noted architect of his day, who also completed the designs for a number of other railway stations for The Midland and Great Western Railway Company (on the Mullingar to Longford and the Inny Junction to Cavan lines) at this time. It remains an important component of the architectural and industrial heritage of County Longford (on the Mullingar to Longford and the Inny Junction to Cavan lines) at this time

St Paul's Church of Ireland Church

This church was built or re-built in 1829 to a cruciform plan and is situated in Main Street. A particularly notable feature is the box pews with fielded panels which are believed to be the last remaining examples in Ireland.

St Mary's Catholic Church

This church was built on lands provided by the Forbes family. It was built by J.J. McCarthy in a standardised gothic style. A separate entrance was originally provided for the Forbes family. Following some structural issues with the church, the roof was lowered, and the internal arcades removed. In the 21st century the church was renovated with a new window in the west facade showing St Barry teaching the children.

Transport

The railway passes through Newtownforbes but the station closed in 1963.  The nearest railway station is Longford.  The Bus Éireann service from Sligo to Dublin and Dublin airport stops in Newtownforbes with approximately 5 services each way, one of which is overnight.  Journeytime to Dublin is typically under 3 hours.

Notable people
Paul Barden, Gaelic Footballer

References

See also
List of towns and villages in Ireland

Towns and villages in County Longford